Kabelo Dlamini (born 16 May 1996) is a South African soccer player who plays as a attacking midfielder or right winger for South African Premier Division side Orlando Pirates.

References

Living people
1996 births
South African soccer players
Association football midfielders
Association football wingers
Bloemfontein Celtic F.C. players
Orlando Pirates F.C. players
South African Premier Division players